The AN/TRC-97 Radio Set, or TRC-97, is a radio set that has 12 multiplex channels (later expanded to 24 channels and 16 telegraph channels connected to an analog radio. The set has been manufactured by RCA, Camden, N.J.

Features 
The TRC-97 can be connected to one of three mobile antennas, depending on the distance and signal strength needed. Another antenna was a simple feed horn type mounted on a  pole. These antennas are transported on trailers and have to be manually erected every time they are used, so knowledge of mechanics as well as electronics was needed to erect and maintain that equipment. The system was powered by a 3-cylinder diesel or later by a turbine generator (TG). A typical crew would consist of two or three wideband (Air Force) technicians and one power production (Air Force) technician to service the generator set. Two units could be used back to back to provide a relay capability for extra long haul traffic. This was usually done at the baseband level without need of any other equipment other than cables. This was accomplished by connecting a single pair of field wires (common military phone line). BZ109 would provide remote order wire, some basic measurements and alarm monitoring.

Three modes of propagation could be used; Tropospheric scatter, Obstacle Gain Diffraction, and line-of-sight. Tropospheric Scatter and Obstacle Gain Diffraction typically used the 1 kW klystron while the line-of-sight mode used the 1W Traveling Wave Tube (TWT). The TWT was replaced late in the TRC-97’s life by a solid-state 1W amplifier.

The receiver of the TRC-97 can pick up very faint radio signals, as low as -105 dBm. The modified TRC-97A (with 12 channels of added multiplex) can receive signals as low as -102 dBm. It uses tunnel diodes, which utilize quantum mechanics theory, to amplify those low signals. The signals from two receivers are sent to a comparator, where they are compared, combined, or used separately, as necessary.

The TRC-97 Radio Set is small, as radio sets go. A trailer hauling a twin set of parabolic antennas and generator is usually pulled by the truck when it goes on its many maneuvers and deployments in support of the American defense system.

The TRC-97 was superseded by a more modern, less maintenance intensive, digital radio set called the AN/TRC-170.

Users 

The TRC-97 was initially made for the Marine Corps to help them with their military operations, such as the Vietnam War. It originally only had only 12 multiplex channels, but when the Air Force decided to use the equipment, they added an additional 12 channels in another module called the baby mux, next to the cabinet that houses the klystron. (This modification caused the equipment to be recognized as the TRC-97A.) Wired to voice channel 1 was a 16 channel teletype multiplexer. The Air Force had been using it for 20 years in the 1980s.

There are several military organizations that have used the TRC-97 and TRC-97A. One such organization was the 601st Tactical Control Wing, headquartered in Sembach Air Base, near Kaiserslautern, Germany, which has one of the largest concentrations of Americans outside of the United States. Also the 606 Tactical Control Squadron, Basdahl, GE outside of Bremerhaven, GE on the North Sea. There was also the 626 and 636 Tactical Control Flights along with the 601st, 602nd and 606th Tactical Control Squadrons fell under the 601st Tactical Control Wing, and military personnel assigned to those squadrons often went on deployment to various sites in Germany, thereby providing a show of force during the cold war.

The 602nd Tactical Control Squadron was located in Turkheim, Germany, which was a remote village in Bavaria. The nearest military installation was an Army installation in Neu Ulm, Germany. The 602nd Tactical Control Squadron closed in 1985, when the United States agreed to minimize their military presence in Germany.

The 728th Tactical Control Squadron was located at Duke Field (Field 3) associated with Eglin Air Force Base located near Fort Walton Fl. The 728 TCS was formerly based at Shaw AFB. the 728th TCS became later known as 728 ACS. Before the 728th, Duke Field was home to the 729th Tactical Control Squadron.

In the 1970s, several TRC-97s were turned over to Air National Guard bases stateside.

The 5th Tactical Control Group based at Clark Air Force Base in the Philippines used the TRC-97 extensively. The 5th TAC's mission was augmentation manning of SEA (Southeast Asia) radar installations. Many, if not most, of those missions were performed via TDY (temporary duty) support to Korea, Vietnam and surrounding areas during the Vietnam War. Most of these microwave links were used to provide communication links between the radar sites and the aircraft bases.

The 5th Combat Communications Group at Robins AFB GA was also a major user of the TRC-97 supporting many missions, one of 3 Combat Comm Groups in the US (the 3rd at Tinker AFB and the 2nd at Patrick AFB)

References
Military.com
Smithsonian/NASA ADS Physics Abstract Service
Troposcatter in South East Asia
David L. Boslaugh. When Computers Went to Sea: The Digitization of the United States Navy John Wiley & Sons, Apr 16, 2003 pg. 272

Military radio systems of the United States
Military electronics of the United States
Military equipment of the United States
Microwave transmission